Drypetes arguta, commonly known as the water ironplum, is a species of small tree or large bush in the family Putranjivaceae. It is native to tropical East Africa. It was first described in 1920 by the English botanist John Hutchinson, who named it Cyclostemon argutus. It was later transferred to the genus Drypetes.

Description
The bark is grey, either smooth or with fine vertical furrows.
The leaves have short stalks and a pair of yellow linear stipules at the base, and are arranged alternately on slender, greyish twigs. There are glands at the tips of the marginal teeth. The flowers grow in clusters or singly in the axils of the leaves. They are unisexual, with male flowers being on a different tree from female flowers.

Distribution and habitat
Drypetes arguta is native to eastern Africa where its range extends from Tanzania and Zimbabwe, southwards to Mozambique, Eswatini, and South Africa (KwaZulu-Natal and the Eastern Cape). It is also a major constituent of the flora of the Southern African Sand Forest, a habitat consisting of woodland growing on ancient sand dunes located on the border between southern Mozambique and northern KwaZulu-Natal.

Uses
Sections of branches of this tree have traditionally been used in hut construction, and the wood has also been used to make sticks. The fruits are edible and have been used to make a fermented alcoholic drink.

References

Drypetes
Flora of South Africa
Trees of Africa
Plants described in 1866